Elena Krivonosova (born 24 June 1972), also known as Olena Kryvonosova, is a retired Ukrainian volleyball player.

She was part of the Ukraine women's national volleyball team at the 1996 Summer Olympics in Atlanta. On club level she played with Dynamo Janestra.

Clubs
 Dynamo Janestra (1994)

References

External links
 
 
 

1972 births
Living people
Ukrainian women's volleyball players
Place of birth missing (living people)
Olympic volleyball players of Ukraine
Volleyball players at the 1996 Summer Olympics